Proto-Northwest Caucasian (sometimes abbreviated PNWC), also Proto-Adyghe-Abazgi or Proto-Adyghe-Abkhaz, is the reconstructed common ancestor of the Northwest Caucasian languages.

Phonology

Consonants

 In Circassian and Abkhaz, gʷǝ is heart and in Ubykh it's gʲǝ.

The most noticeable changes are:
The uvular consonants (/χ/ /ʁ/ /χʷ/ /ʁʷ/) become pharyngeal consonants (/ħ/ /ʕ/ /ħʷ/ /ʕʷ/) in the Proto-Abazgi language.

Grammar

Numbers

Words

See also

 Proto-Circassian language
 Proto-Abazgi language

References

STAROSTIN, Sergei A.; NIKOLAYEV, Sergei L. (1994). A North Caucasian Etymological Dictionary: Preface.

External links
 Abkhaz-Adyghe etymology

Northwest Caucasian
Northwest Caucasian languages